The 2018 Liga 1, also known as Go-Jek Liga 1 for sponsorship reasons, was the second season of Liga 1 under its current name and the ninth season of the top-flight Indonesian professional league for association football clubs since its establishment in 2008. The season started on 23 March 2018 and ended on 9 December 2018. Fixtures for the 2018 season were announced on 10 March 2018.

Bhayangkara were the defending champions. Persebaya, PSMS, and PSIS joined as the promoted teams from the 2017 Liga 2. They replaced Persegres, Persiba, and Semen Padang who were relegated to the 2018 Liga 2.

Persija won their first Liga 1 title, and second Indonesian top-flight title overall on the final day of the season, finishing on 62 points.

Overview

Player regulations
Player registration was divided into two periods. The first period opened from 10 February 2018 and closes on 5 April 2018. Then the second period was done on 5 July to 3 August 2018. Clubs could register at least 18 players and a maximum of 30 players. The club was also required to contract at least seven local U-23 players (born on or after 1 January 1996). Unlike last season, U-23 players were not required to play in one game.

Persija and Bali United got privileges related to player quota. Both were allowed to add three local players with no age limit, following their participation in the 2018 AFC Cup representing Indonesia.

Referee
Unlike last season, the league operator ensured that they did not use any foreign referees for this season.

Teams
Eighteen teams competed in the league – the top fifteen teams from the previous season and three teams promoted from the Liga 2. The new teams this season were Persebaya, PSMS, and PSIS, who replaced Persegres, Persiba, and Semen Padang.

Name changes
 PS TNI were renamed to PS TIRA and relocated to Bantul.

Stadiums and locations

Notes:

Personnel and kits 
Note: Flags indicate national team as has been defined under FIFA eligibility rules. Players and coaches may hold more than one non-FIFA nationality.

Notes:

 On the front of shirt.
 On the back of shirt.
 On the sleeves.
 On the shorts.
Additionally, referee kits are made by Specs and Nike supplied the match ball.

Apparel changes:

Coaching changes

Foreign players
Football Association of Indonesia restricted the number of foreign players to four per team, including one slot for a player from AFC countries. Teams can use all the foreign players at once.
 Players name in bold indicates the player was registered during the mid-season transfer window.
 Former Player(s) were players that out of squad or left club within the season, after pre-season transfer window, or in the mid-season transfer window, and at least had one appearance.

Source: First transfer window, Second transfer window

League table

Results

Season statistics

Top goalscorers

Hat-tricks

Discipline

 Most yellow card(s): 12
  Marc Klok (PSM)
 Most red card(s): 3
  Mahamadou N'Diaye (Bali United/Sriwijaya)

Attendances

Awards

See also
 2018 Liga 2
 2018 Liga 3
 2018–19 Piala Indonesia

References

Works cited

External links 
 

 
Liga 1 seasons
Liga 1
1
Indonesia